Neticonazole (INN) is an imidazole antifungal for the treatment of fungal skin infections.

Neticonazole is only approved for use in Japan. It is sold as a topical ointment under the tradename Atolant.

References

Phenol ethers
Thioethers
Alkene derivatives
Imidazole antifungals
Lanosterol 14α-demethylase inhibitors